Srdjan Tufegdzic, commonly known as Túfa, (born 6 April 1980) is a Serbian football manager and former football player. He is the manager of Swedish club Öster.

Managerial career

Tufegdzic took charge of Icelandic 1.deild team KA on 11 August 2015 as a caretaker manager, replacing Bjarni Jóhannsson. The club was in 5th place in the league when Tufegdzic took over, but the club managed to challenge for promotion and ended in 3rd place. After good performances under Tufegdzic, winning 5 of the team's 7 games left, he was appointed the head coach for the 2016 season.

In 2016 Tufegdzic managed KA to become 1.deild champions and securing a place in Úrvalsdeild 2017, the club won overall 16 of its 22 games. The 2017 Úrvalsdeildar season KA played their first Úrvalsdeildar game in 13 years and Tufegdzic's men ended in 7th place.

For the 2022 season, Tufegdic was hired by Öster in the Swedish second-tier Superettan.

Managerial statistics

Includes games played in Icelandic Premier League, Icelandic Cup and Icelandic League Cup.

Honours and achievements

Manager
Knattspyrnufélag Akureyrar
1. deild (1): winner 2016 Promoted to the Úrvalsdeild

Assistant Manager
Valur Reykjavík
Icelandic Champion: 2020

References

1980 births
Sportspeople from Kruševac
Living people
Serbian footballers
Association football midfielders
Knattspyrnufélag Akureyrar players
Serbian expatriate footballers
Expatriate footballers in Iceland
Serbian expatriate sportspeople in Iceland
Serbian football managers
Knattspyrnufélag Akureyrar managers
Grindavík men's football managers
Östers IF managers
Úrvalsdeild karla (football) managers
Superettan managers
Serbian expatriate football managers
Expatriate football managers in Iceland
Expatriate football managers in Sweden
Serbian expatriate sportspeople in Sweden